Target Hong Kong is a 1953 American action film noir directed by Fred F. Sears.

Plot
American mercenaries attempt to stop a spy ring targeting Hong Kong.

Cast
 Richard Denning as Mike Lassiter
 Nancy Gates as Ming Shan
 Richard Loo as Fu Chao
 Soo Yong as Lao Shan
 Ben Astar as Suma
 Michael Pate as Dockery Pete Gresham
 Philip Ahn as Sin How
 Henry Kulky as Dutch Pfeifer

References

External links

1953 films
Films directed by Fred F. Sears
Columbia Pictures films
Films set in Hong Kong
Cold War spy films
American black-and-white films
American action films
1950s action films
1950s English-language films
1950s American films